The 1940–41 Yorkshire Cup was held in spring 1941.

The  Yorkshire Cup competition was a knock-out competition between (mainly professional) rugby league clubs from  the  county of Yorkshire. The actual area was at times increased to encompass other teams from  outside the  county such as Newcastle, Mansfield, Coventry, and even London (in the form of Acton & Willesden). The competition always took place early in the season, in the Autumn, with the final taking place in (or just before) December. The only exception to this was when disruption of the fixture list was caused during, and immediately after, the two World Wars.

The Second World War was continuing and the  Yorkshire Cup was moved to the  end of the  1940–41 Northern Rugby Football League Wartime Emergency League season.

1940–41 was the thirty-third occasion on which the  Yorkshire Cup competition had been held.
This season's competition is classed as a "Wartime Emergency Competition" and therefore the  results did not count as an official competition win. However, this aside and for the second consecutive competition, there was a new winner for this season's trophy, Bradford Northern winning the trophy by beating Dewsbury by the score of 15-5. The match was played at Fartown, Huddersfield, now in West Yorkshire. The attendance was 13,316 and receipts were £939.

Change in Club participation

Hull Kingston Rovers – The club dropped out of the wartime Lancashire league after the ‘first (1939–40) season. They did not return to league competition until 1945–46 peacetime season.

Wigan - This club entered the  Yorkshire Cup competition.

Oldham - The  club, as Wigan, also entered the  Yorkshire Cup competition.

Batley, Bramley and Keighley all rejoined the  competition after appearing to withdraw from  last season's competition.

Dewsbury  - had a relatively successful time during the war years. Managed by Eddie Waring, and with the side boosted by the inclusion of a number of big-name guest players, the club won the Wartime Emergency League in 1941–42 and again the following season 1942–43  (though that championship was declared null and void when it was discovered they had played an ineligible player). They were also runners-up in the Championship in 1943–44, Challenge Cup winners in 1943 and Yorkshire Cup final appearances in this season 1940–41 and winners in 1942–43.

Background 
This season there were no junior/amateur clubs taking part, but with the  addition of the  two Lancashire clubs, Wigan and Oldham, the  total number of entrants increased by four to the  total of sixteen.

This in turn resulted in no byes in the first round.

Competition and results

Round 1 
Involved  8 matches (with no byes) and 16 clubs

Round 2 - quarterfinals 
Involved 4 matches and 8 clubs

Round 3 – semifinals  
Involved 2 matches and 4 clubs

Final

Teams and scorers 

Scoring - Try = three (3) points - Goal = two (2) points - Drop goal = two (2) points

The road to success

Notes and comments 
1 * Oldham joined the Yorkshire Cup. This was the first Yorkshire Cup match to be played by Oldham

2 * Wigan joined the Yorkshire Cup. This was the first Yorkshire Cup match to be played by Wigan and the first at Central Park

3 * Fartown was the home ground of Huddersfield from 1878 to the end of the 1991-92 season to Huddersfield Town FC's Leeds Road stadium, and then to the McAlpine Stadium in 1994. Fartown remained as a sports/Rugby League ground but is now rather dilapidated, and is only used for staging amateur rugby league games.

See also 
1940–41 Northern Rugby Football League Wartime Emergency League season
Rugby league county cups

References

External links
Saints Heritage Society
1896–97 Northern Rugby Football Union season at wigan.rlfans.com
Hull&Proud Fixtures & Results 1896/1897
Widnes Vikings - One team, one passion Season In Review - 1896-97
The Northern Union at warringtonwolves.org

Yorkshire Cup 2
1941 Yorkshire Cup 2